Persiaran Selatan is a major highway in Putrajaya, Malaysia. It connects Cyberjaya South Interchange in the west to Lebuh Wadi Ehsan interchange in the east.

Lists of interchanges

Highways in Malaysia
Highways in Putrajaya

References